Polypyrimidine tract binding protein 2, also known as PTBP2, is a protein which in humans is encoded by the PTBP2 gene.

Function 
The protein encoded by this gene binds to the intronic cluster of RNA regulatory elements, downstream control sequence (DCS). It is implicated in controlling the assembly of other splicing-regulatory proteins. This protein is very similar to the polypyrimidine tract-binding protein  PTBP1 but it is expressed primarily in the brain.

References